The 1990 Latvian Individual Speedway Championship was the 16th Latvian Individual Speedway Championship season. The final took place on 7 October 1990 in Riga, Latvia. The defending champion was Valery Sokolov.

Final 
 October 7, 1990
  Riga

Speedway in Latvia
1990 in Latvian sport
1990 in speedway